Nannophryne corynetes, the Abra Malaga toad, is a species of toad in the family Bufonidae that is endemic to Peru and only found in the region of the type locality in the Urubamba Province. Its natural habitats are forest edges restricted to the zone of puna grassland directly adjacent to montane forest. Breeding habitat is unknown but probably aquatic. It is a very rare species but there are no immediate threats to it.

References

corynetes
Amphibians described in 1991
Amphibians of the Andes
Amphibians of Peru
Endemic fauna of Peru
Taxonomy articles created by Polbot